Ardan Aras (born in Polewali Mandar Regency, West Sulawesi, 2 March 1984) is an Indonesian professional footballer who plays for and captains Liga 2 club Persijap Jepara. He normally plays as a central defender or left back, but can be deployed as a defensive midfielder as well.

International career
Ardan has been a regular for Indonesia U-23 Team since 2006, participating in a national training at The Hague, Netherlands.
He has participated in Asian Games Qatar in 2006 and SEA Games Thailand in 2007, where he scored a free-kick in a 3–1 defeat of Cambodia.

International goals
International under-23 goals

References

External links
 Ardan Aras at Liga Indonesia
 

Indonesian footballers
1984 births
Living people
Sportspeople from West Sulawesi
Indonesia international footballers
Liga 1 (Indonesia) players
Badak Lampung F.C. players
Badak Lampung F.C.
Liga 2 (Indonesia) players
PSM Makassar players
Pelita Jaya FC players
Mitra Kukar players
PS Barito Putera players
Association football midfielders
Footballers at the 2006 Asian Games
Asian Games competitors for Indonesia